Coomans or Cooman is a Dutch occupational surname most common in Belgium. The name derives via assimilation from the common surname Koopman ("merchant). Among variant forms are Comans, Coopman(s), De Cooman, Koeman(s), Kooman, Koomen, and Koopmans. People with this name include:

Cooman
Carson Cooman (born 1982), American composer and organist
Nelli Cooman (born 1964), Dutch sprinter of Surinamese origin
Coomans
Diana Coomans (1861–1952), Belgian painter, sister of Heva
Heva Coomans (1860–1939), Belgian painter, sister of Diana
Jacques Coomans (1888–1980), Belgian racing cyclist
Pierre Olivier Joseph Coomans (1816–1889), Belgian painter, father of Heva and Diana
De Cooman
Daan De Cooman (born 1974), Belgian judoka
 (1893–1949), Belgian painter
Kooman
 Andrew Kooman (born 1979), Canadian author playwright
 Michael Kooman (born 1984), American cabaret and musical composer

See also
Coman, surname, usually of Celtic origin
Charles Kennedy Comans (1914–2012), Australian lawyer and lecturer

References

Dutch-language surnames
Occupational surnames
Surnames of Belgian origin